Peter Lang (born 12 June 1989) is a Danish sailor. Together with Allan Nørregaard, he won bronze at the 2012 Summer Olympics in the 49er class.

References

Danish male sailors (sport)
Living people
Olympic sailors of Denmark
Sailors at the 2012 Summer Olympics – 49er
Olympic bronze medalists for Denmark
Olympic medalists in sailing
1989 births
Medalists at the 2012 Summer Olympics
People from Vejle Municipality
Sportspeople from the Region of Southern Denmark